= Kourtney Reppert =

American model and entrepreneur (born 1986)

- Born: April 8, 1986 (age 40); Pennsylvania
- Occupations: Model; Entrepreneur
- Years active: 2004–present
- Modeling information
- Hair color: blonde
- Eye color: blue

Kourtney Elizabeth Reppert (born April 8, 1986, Pennsylvania) is an American model, entrepreneur, media executive, and philanthropist.

== Life ==
Reppert previously resided in California. She is a single mother of one son and has cited him as a primary source of motivation in her professional life. Reppert is expected to publish her memoir, Beyond the Image, in 2026, which will cover her life from being a student-athlete in Pennsylvania to her career in modeling and media.

== Model career ==
Reppert began her professional modeling career in Philadelphia, where she gained regional recognition. She was named "Philly's Hottest Blonde" by WMMR and received the title of "Model of the Year" from both the Philadelphia Phillies and the Philadelphia Flyers. Her modeling work has appeared in major publications including Sports Illustrated, Maxim, FHM, and Playboy, for which she has been featured on the cover multiple times. She has also appeared as a cover model for Vogue Monaco and was featured on the cover of Harper's Bazaar in March 2026.

In addition to editorial work, Reppert has participated in various advertising campaigns, including collaborations with Macy's and other commercial brands. She has also worked as a double and stand-in for Jessica Simpson in select projects.

=== Entrepreneurship and Media Activities ===
Reppert has been involved in multiple business and media ventures:

- The 1% Magazine – Serving as Editor-in-Chief, she has overseen the publication's expansion, including the launch of a West Palm Beach, Florida edition in 2026.
- İndigo Alien Beauty – A skincare brand developed based on her licensed aesthetic expertise.
- KR Media – A media company founded by Reppert, focused on media strategy, branding, and personal brand development for clients and public figures.

== Public Activity and Philanthropy ==
Reppert is the founder of the Kourtney Kares Foundation.

In 2012, Reppert was the victim of a cyberstalking case that led to a federal investigation. The incident received national media attention and was covered by television programs such as Good Morning America and Nightline. She was also affected by wildfires in California, during which she lost her home.
